Paulo Alexandre Sousa Alves (born 19 December 1993 in Lisbon) is a Portuguese footballer who plays as a defensive midfielder.

References

External links

1993 births
Living people
Portuguese sportspeople of Angolan descent
Footballers from Lisbon
Portuguese footballers
Association football midfielders
Odivelas F.C. players
A.D. Nogueirense players
Cypriot First Division players
Doxa Katokopias FC players
Girabola players
Kabuscorp S.C.P. players
Portuguese expatriate footballers
Expatriate footballers in Cyprus
Portuguese expatriate sportspeople in Cyprus
Expatriate footballers in Angola
Portuguese expatriate sportspeople in Angola